Vladimir Šubic (23 May 1894 – 16 November 1946) was a Slovene architect. He designed many buildings, most notably Nebotičnik in Ljubljana, which was the tallest building in Yugoslavia upon its completion.

Life
Šubic was born in Ljubljana, then the capital of the Duchy of Carniola, part of Austria-Hungary. He began his studies at the Technical University of Vienna in 1912, studying mechanical engineering. He studied shipbuilding at the University of Graz a year later, and in 1919 enrolled in the department of architecture at VTŠ in Prague. He passed his final examinations in 1922 and began his career as an architect and engineer.

He returned to Ljubljana, then part of the Kingdom of Serbs, Croats and Slovenes and soon became a successful architect. His interest in contemporary architectural developments led him to design the first Slovene skyscraper, based on the most recent architectural developments.

After World War II his career became endangered because of his liberal worldview, regarded as hostile by the new Communist authorities. He was first imprisoned on secret charges and sentenced to forced labor, and then released and denied work. In 1946, he was sent by the Titoist regime of the Federal People's Republic of Yugoslavia to the work brigade in Bosnia, to work as an engineer on the construction of the Brčko-Banovići railway line. He died in Lukavac building the line the same year under unknown circumstances, although the cause of death was officially reported as a heart attack. He is buried in the Škofja Loka cemetery.

Buildings 

Vladimir Šubic was the architect of many buildings. Below is a list of his more notable accomplishments:

The Nebotičnik high-rise
The Koehler Mansion
The Meksika apartment house
The Chamber of Labour (Delavska zbornica), now the seat of the Slovenian Cinematheque
Several apartment blocks for the Pension Fund Institution (Pokojninski zavod)
The tomb for the Jelačin family
The Šubic Mansion
The Palace of Trade
The Grafika Palace
The Palace of Trade Academy
The Udarnik Cinema in Maribor
The Putnik Pavilion in Belgrade

See also
Mirko Šubic
Ivan Vurnik

References

External links 

Vladimir Šubic, Arhitekturni vodnik

1894 births
1946 deaths
Architects from Ljubljana
TU Wien alumni
University of Graz alumni